The 2017–18 Slovenian Second League season was the 27th edition of the Slovenian Second League. The season began on 4 August 2017 and ended on 26 May 2018.

Competition format
Each team played a total of 30 matches (15 home and 15 away). Teams played two matches against each other (one home and one away).

Teams

On 29 June 2016, the Football Association of Slovenia decided to expand the Second League from 10 to 16 teams for the 2017–18 season. 

The key for the 16 teams contesting the league was:
1 relegated team from the 2016–17 Slovenian PrvaLiga
7 teams ranked second to eighth in the 2016–17 Slovenian Second League
The best two teams from each of the four groups in the 2016–17 Slovenian Third League, for a total of 8 teams.

Stadiums and locations

Note: "Capacity" includes seating capacity only. Most stadiums also have standing areas.

Personnel
As of May 2018

League table

Standings

Results

Season statistics

Top goalscorers

Source: NZS

Attendance

 
Note 1:Team played the previous season in the Slovenian PrvaLiga.  Note 2:Team played the previous season in the Slovenian Third League.

See also
2017–18 Slovenian Football Cup
2017–18 Slovenian PrvaLiga
2017–18 Slovenian Third League

References

External links
Official website 

Slovenian Second League seasons
2017–18 in Slovenian football
Slovenia